Fred Shay may refer to:

Fred Shay, character in Lost Angels
Fred Shay, character in Suburgatory